The Best of the Super Juniors (often abbreviated BOSJ) is an annual professional wrestling tournament held by New Japan Pro-Wrestling (NJPW), typically in May or June. Originally known as Top of the Super Juniors, the first tournament was held in 1988 with annual tournaments taking place since 1991. The wrestlers in the tournament are typically junior heavyweight wrestlers from promotions all over the world. NJPW has held 28 Super Juniors tournaments. Hiromu Takahashi holds the record for most tournament wins with four, while Jushin Thunder Liger and Koji Kanemoto have won three each. Takahashi is also the only wrestler to have won three consecutive tournaments. Kanemoto holds the record for the most final appearances, having wrestled eight finals between 1997 and 2009. Liger has participated in the most tournaments, competing in all tournaments except 1995 and 2000 until his 26th and final Super Junior tournament in 2017.

History and format
The tournament was formed in 1988 by NJPW. It was originally called the Top of the Super Juniors. The tournament is a round-robin style tournament where a wrestler scores points. The winner, assuming they are not already the champion, receives an opportunity to wrestle for the IWGP Junior Heavyweight Championship not long after the tournament is over. Since 2010, the title match has taken place at June/July's Dominion event.

In 1994, the tournament was renamed the Best of the Super Juniors. Since 1996 the tournament has been divided into a two-block system used in many other puroresu tournaments. In this format the top two scorers in each block advance to the semifinals, at which point single-elimination rules take effect. During the round-robin portion, a win is worth two points, a time limit draw is worth one, and any other result zero; all matches have a 30-minute time limit, though in the past it has been twenty minutes.

Top of the Super Juniors (1988–1993)

1988
The 1988 Top of the Super Juniors was a 12-man tournament held from January 4 to February 7. The points system at this time was different from today's, though exactly how is unclear. The two wrestlers with the most points at the end of the tournament, Shiro Koshinaka and Hiroshi Hase, faced off in a singles match to determine the winner. The winner, Koshinaka, went on to win the Junior Heavyweight Championship from Owen Hart on June 24, 1988, after failing to win the title from Hiroshi Hase twice on March 19 and May 8.

1991
The 1991 Top of the Super Juniors was a seven-man tournament held from April 15 to April 30 and the first to use the modern points system. Before the tournament, the reigning Junior Heavyweight Champion, Jushin Thunder Liger, vacated the title so the winner of the 1991 Top of the Super Juniors also became the champion; with his victory over Liger in the final, Norio Honaga also won the championship.

1992
The 1992 Top of the Super Juniors was a nine-man tournament, held from April 16 to April 30. The winner, Jushin Thunder Liger, became the first man to win the tournament while holding the IWGP Junior Heavyweight Championship.

1993
The 1993 Top of the Super Juniors was an 11-man tournament held from May 26 to June 14. As the result of a four-way tie for second place (Jushin Thunder Liger was also tied, but was eliminated due to injury), the four men held a playoff tournament to challenge first-place Pegasus Kid (better known as Chris Benoit) in the final; this ended up being El Samurai, who would nonetheless fall against Pegasus Kid. Pegasus became the first foreign wrestler to win the tournament as a result. He also went on to challenge the champion Liger unsuccessfully on August 8. Eddie Guerrero participated in the 1992 tournament under his real name, but wrestled in the 1993 tournament as "Black Tiger"

Best of the Super Juniors (1994–present)

1994
The 1994 Best of the Super Juniors, the first tournament to be held under that name, was an 11-man tournament contested from May 26 to June 13. Jushin Thunder Liger once again won while also the reigning Junior Heavyweight champion, and also became the first wrestler to win the tournament twice. Guest natives included Super Delfin and Taka Michinoku from Michinoku Pro Wrestling and Masayoshi Motegi from Wrestle Dream Factory.

1995
The 1995 Best of the Super Juniors was a 10-man tournament held from June 23 to July 13. Like Jushin Thunder Liger the year prior, Wild Pegasus (formerly Pegasus Kid) won the tournament for the second time and was the only gaijin ("foreigner") to do so until Prince Devitt won the tournament in 2010. Like in 1993, Pegasus failed in his championship challenge, this time against Koji Kanemoto on September 25, 1995. Gran Hamada from Michinoku Pro Wrestling was the guest native.

1996
The 1996 Best of the Super Juniors was held from May 24 to June 12 and was the first to use the two-block format, featuring seven wrestlers in each block. The winner, Black Tiger, would unsuccessfully challenge The Great Sasuke for the championship on June 17, 1996.

1997
The 1997 Best of the Super Juniors was a two-block, 14-man tournament held from May 16 to June 5. This and the following tournament in 1998 would utilize a points system that involved simply one point for a win, and zero for a loss or draw. The winner, El Samurai, went on to defeat Jushin Thunder Liger for the championship on July 6. Guest natives included Gran Naniwa and Hanzo Nakajima from Michinoku Pro Wrestling and Yoshihiro Tajiri from Big Japan Pro Wrestling. The final pitting Kanemoto against Samurai was awarded five stars by Dave Meltzer.

1998
The 1998 Best of the Super Juniors was a two-block, 12-man tournament held from May 16 to June 3. Like the previous year, it used a simpler points system, including one point for a win and zero for a loss or draw. The winner, Koji Kanemoto, would make an unsuccessful challenge to the champion, Jushin Thunder Liger, on July 15, as well as an equally unsuccessful rematch on January 4, 1999, before beating Liger for the title on March 17, 1999.

1999
The 1999 Best of the Super Juniors was a two-block, 12-man tournament held from May 19 to June 8. The winner, Kendo Kashin, went on to defeat the champion Koji Kanemoto for the title on August 28, who he had also defeated in the BOSJ final. Kanemoto became the first person to reach the final three years in a row.

2000
The 2000 Best of the Super Juniors was a two-block, 12-man tournament held from May 19 to June 9. The winner, Tatsuhito Takaiwa, would go on to defeat Jushin Thunder Liger for the title on July 20, 2000, ending Liger's last reign with the championship.

2001
The 2001 Best of the Super Juniors was a two-block, 12-man tournament held from May 18 to June 4. With his victory, Jushin Thunder Liger became both the first person to win the tournament three times and the first to not lose a single match during the tournament. For unclear reasons, Liger did not receive a championship match as a reward for his victory.

2002
The 2002 Best of the Super Juniors was a 14-man, two-block tournament held from May 18 to June 5. It once again used the 1997–98 system of one point for a win, and zero for a loss or draw. The two-time winner, Koji Kanemoto, went on to defeat champion Minoru Tanaka for the title on July 19, the same man he defeated in the final of the tournament. The Black Tiger who wrestled in the 2002 event was not Eddie Guerrero who had previously participated in the tournament under that name, but luchador Silver King, who had taken over the character in the preceding year.

2003
The 2003 Best of the Super Juniors was a 14-man, two-block tournament held from May 23 to June 11. It introduced the modern system of each block's top two scorers advancing to the semifinals with Masahito Kakihara winning the tournament. The winner, would unsuccessfully challenge champion Tiger Mask IV on July 6, despite having beaten him in the tournament.

2004
The 2004 Best of the Super Juniors was a 16-man, two-block tournament held from May 22 to June 13. It featured a unique structure from other years: the top scorer from each block would advance to the semifinals, while the second and third-place finishers in each block would start in the quarterfinals. Jushin Thunder Liger, after finishing first in Block A, was forced to withdraw from the tournament due to a spinal injury, leaving American Dragon to go to the semifinals instead. The eventual winner, Tiger Mask IV, would unsuccessfully challenge Heat for the title on July 19, though he would defeat him in a rematch on January 4, 2005.

2005
The 2005 Best of the Super Juniors was a 14-man, two-block tournament held from May 21 to June 19. The winner, Tiger Mask IV, became the first person to win the tournament in consecutive years until Hiromu Takahashi would share he record in 2020 and 2021. Tiger Mask was also the first since Jushin Thunder Liger in 1994 to win the tournament as champion. 2005 saw the participation of the third wrestler under the Black Tiger mask as Rocky Romero had begun working as Black Tiger IV in the preceding year.

2006
The 2006 Best of the Super Juniors was a 14-man, two-block tournament held from May 27 to June 18. The winner, Minoru, went on to defeat Koji Kanemoto for the title in December 2006. This tournament marked the first time that neither block winner made it to the final.

2007
The 2007 Best of the Super Juniors was a 14-man, two-block tournament held from June 1 to June 17. On June 7, it was announced that Prince Devitt would be forced to withdraw from the tournament due to an injury, forfeiting all scheduled matches in the process. Milano Collection A.T. became the first wrestler since Shiro Koshinaka to win the tournament on his first try, but would fail to capture the Junior Heavyweight championship.

2008
The 2008 Best of the Super Juniors featured 12 participants in two blocks and was held from May 31 to June 15. Outside entrants include Tatsuhito Takaiwa from Pro Wrestling Zero1 and Jimmy Rave from Total Nonstop Action Wrestling. Prince Devitt was again forced out due to injury following his match with Tiger Mask IV, forfeiting his remaining matches. Immediately after the tournament, winner Wataru Inoue, who also joined Liger and Tiger in winning the tournament as champion, graduated to the heavyweight division, vacating the IWGP Junior Heavyweight Championship in the process.

2009
The 2009 Best of the Super Juniors featured 14 participants in two blocks and was held from May 30 to June 14. With his victory Koji Kanemoto became only the second wrestler to win the tournament three times in total. He lost a title match on July 20 against the defending champion Tiger Mask IV.

2010
The 2010 Best of the Super Juniors featured 16 participants in two blocks, and was held from May 30 to June 13. Outside entrants included Fujita "Jr." Hayato (Michinoku Pro), Kota Ibushi (DDT Pro-Wrestling), Kenny Omega (DDT/Ring of Honor/Pro Wrestling Guerrilla, United States), Kushida (Smash), La Sombra (Consejo Mundial de Lucha Libre, Mexico), Davey Richards (ROH/PWG, United States), and Taiji Ishimori (Pro Wrestling Noah). On May 31, 2010 it was announced that Tiger Mask IV had suffered a vertebra injury during his match against La Sombra and was forced out of action for two months. As a result of his injury Tiger Mask IV withdrew from the competition, forfeiting the rest of his matches, automatically giving all of his opponents two points. On June 6, 2010 Fujita Hayato had to forfeit his match against Akira due to an injury and also forfeit the rest of the tournament. The winner of the tournament, Prince Devitt, went on to defeat Naomichi Marufuji on June 19, 2010, at Dominion 6.19 to become the new IWGP Junior Heavyweight Champion.

2011
The 2011 Best of the Super Juniors featured 18 participants in two blocks, and was held from May 26 to June 10. This marked the largest number of entrants in the history of the tournament. Outside entrants included Daisuke Sasaki (freelancer), Fujita "Jr." Hayato (Michinoku Pro), Great Sasuke (Michinoku Pro), Kenny Omega (DDT Pro-Wrestling, United States), Kota Ibushi (DDT), Máscara Dorada (Consejo Mundial de Lucha Libre, Mexico), and TJP (freelancer, United States). Sasaki and Taichi earned their spots in the tournament by winning Road to the Super Jr. 2Days Tournaments on April 8, 2011. Kota Ibushi became the first wrestler not affiliated with New Japan Pro-Wrestling to win the tournament. He went on to defeat Prince Devitt for the IWGP Junior Heavyweight Championship on June 18, 2011.

2012
The 2012 Best of the Super Juniors featured 18 participants and took place from May 27 to June 10. Outside entrants included Alex Koslov (American independents), Ángel de Oro (Consejo Mundial de Lucha Libre), Brian Kendrick (American independents), Daisuke Sasaki (freelancer), and Pac (Dragon Gate). Black Tiger earned his spot in the tournament by winning the Road to the Super Jr. 2Days Tournament on April 15, 2012. On May 9, New Japan announced that Davey Richards had to pull out of the tournament, following his doctor's orders after a car accident. He was replaced by Brian Kendrick. On May 25, New Japan announced that Black Tiger had been pulled from the tournament, two days after the character's performer Nosawa Rongai had been arrested for smuggling marijuana. He was replaced by Hiromu Takahashi. The tagline of the event was "The door to the glory". For the fifth year in a row, the previous year's runner-up, this time Ryusuke Taguchi, came back to win the tournament. Taguchi went on to unsuccessfully challenge Low Ki for the IWGP Junior Heavyweight Championship on June 16 at Dominion 6.16.

2013
The twentieth Best of the Super Juniors tournament was officially announced on March 28, 2013, and took place over ten shows between May 24 and June 9. The participants were announced on May 3; outside entrants included Beretta (American independents), Brian Kendrick (American independents), Kenny Omega (DDT), Ricochet (Dragon Gate), and Titán (Consejo Mundial de Lucha Libre). Ryusuke Taguchi, who originally won Block B, was sidelined with a hip injury following June 6 and was replaced in his semifinal match by Taka Michinoku, who had finished third in the block. The winner, Prince Devitt, became only the third wrestler to win all of his matches in the tournament. When Jushin Thunder Liger achieved the feat in 2001, his tournament comprised only six matches, while Devitt's comprised ten.

2014
The twenty-first Best of the Super Juniors tournament was officially announced on March 14, 2014, and took place between May 30 and June 8. The participants were announced on May 4; outside entrants included Kenny Omega (DDT), Máscara Dorada (Consejo Mundial de Lucha Libre) and Ricochet (Dragon Gate). For the first time in four years, the reigning IWGP Junior Heavyweight Champion did not take part in the tournament as Kota Ibushi was concentrating on chasing the NEVER Openweight Championship. Alex Koslov dislocated his left shoulder in his first match against Ricochet on May 30 and was forced to pull out of the tournament, forfeiting all of his matches. Alex Shelley won block B of the tournament, but was forced to pull out of the semifinals after suffering a shoulder injury in his final round-robin match. As a result, Taichi, who had finished third in the block, advanced to the semifinals.

2015
The twenty-second Best of the Super Juniors tournament was officially announced on March 4, 2015, and took place between May 22 and June 7. The participants were announced on May 7; outside entrants included Bárbaro Cavernario (Consejo Mundial de Lucha Libre), Bobby Fish (Ring of Honor), Chase Owens (National Wrestling Alliance), Kyle O'Reilly (ROH) and the debuting David Finlay Jr., the son of Dave Finlay. For the second year in a row, the reigning IWGP Junior Heavyweight Champion, Kenny Omega, did not enter the tournament. Instead, the winner of the tournament would challenge for his title at Dominion 7.5 in Osaka-jo Hall. Alex Shelley was forced to pull out of the tournament after his opening match with a foot injury, forcing him to forfeit the rest of his matches.

2016
The twenty-third Best of the Super Juniors tournament took place between May 21 and June 7, 2016. The participants were announced on May 3. Outside entrants included Volador Jr. (Consejo Mundial de Lucha Libre), Bobby Fish, Kyle O'Reilly, Matt Sydal, Barreta (Ring of Honor), Chase Owens (National Wrestling Alliance), Will Ospreay (Revolution Pro Wrestling) and Ricochet (Dragon Gate, Pro Wrestling Guerrilla). Matt Jackson and Nick Jackson were originally announced for the tournament, but both were forced to pull out with injuries before the opening day. On May 19, Matt was replaced with David Finlay Jr. and Nick with Chase Owens. With his win, Will Ospreay, the first English winner of the tournament, also became the youngest Best of the Super Juniors winner in history. Ospreay went on to unsuccessfully challenge Kushida for the IWGP Junior Heavyweight Championship on June 19 at Dominion 6.19 in Osaka-jo Hall. The tournament became known for a controversial match between Ospreay and Ricochet on May 27, which received widespread attention in the professional wrestling world with some, like William Regal, praising the two and others, like Vader, comparing the match to a "gymnastics routine".

2017
The twenty-fourth Best of the Super Juniors tournament took place between May 17 and June 3, 2017. The participants were revealed on May 3. In addition to NJPW regulars, the tournament also featured Consejo Mundial de Lucha Libre (CMLL) wrestlers Dragon Lee and Volador Jr., Ring of Honor (ROH) wrestler Marty Scurll and independent wrestler A. C. H. Veteran wrestler Jushin Thunder Liger, who took part in his 17th Best of the Super Juniors tournament in a row, stated that the 2017 tournament would be his last.

2018
The twenty-fifth Best of the Super Juniors started on May 18 and ended on June 4, 2018. The participants were revealed on May 7. In addition to NJPW regulars, the tournament also features Consejo Mundial de Lucha Libre (CMLL) wrestler Dragon Lee, Ring of Honor (ROH) wrestlers Marty Scurll, Flip Gordon and Chris Sabin, and independent wrestler A. C. H. The final match between Taiji Ishimori and Hiromu Takahashi became the longest match in BOSJ history breaking the previous record from 2015. It was also the first time since 2011 that the final did not feature a gaijin wrestler. The final match was given a 5 star rating by Dave Meltzer of the Wrestling Observer Newsletter.

2019
The twenty-sixth Best of the Super Juniors started on May 13, 2019, and ended on June 5, 2019. The final took place at Ryōgoku Kokugikan. The participants were all revealed bar one on April 23. In addition to NJPW regulars, the tournament will also feature Consejo Mundial de Lucha Libre (CMLL) wrestlers Dragon Lee and Titán and Ring of Honor (ROH) wrestlers Marty Scurll, Jonathan Gresham and Bandido. This is the first edition to have twenty wrestlers entering the tournament. Before the tournament, El Desperado had to pull out due to injury and was replaced by Douki. Flip Gordon also had to pull out due to visa issues, being replaced by young lion Ren Narita. Taka Michinoku forfeited his final three matches due to a leg injury.

The 2019 edition included a record twenty participants; Shingo Takagi won all his matches in Block A, therefore becoming the first person to win nine matches within the same block, and setting a new record for most points scored at the tournament with 18 (apart from the inaugural 1988 edition, which used a different points system); the previous record for the current format was held by Prince Devitt, who won all eight of his matches in 2013 and scored 16.

2020
The twenty-seventh Best of the Super Juniors was originally scheduled to take place from May 12, 2020, to June 6, 2020.  It was postponed as a result of the global pandemic, and combined with the World Tag League from November 15 to December 11. On the intermission of the November 2, 2020 Road to Power Struggle show, it was announced that the tournament will be held in a single block format with ten participants. Yoshinobu Kanemaru was scheduled to participate in the tournament, however, he pulled out due to injury and was replaced by young lion Yuya Uemura. The final was held at Nippon Budokan.

2021
The twenty-eighth Best of the Super Juniors started on November 13, 2021. The entire field of participants was announced on November 8, 2021. Like last year's tournament, it was held in a single block format, with twelve participants instead of ten. Many of last year's participants  returned, along with Yoshinobu Kanemaru, who was originally scheduled to compete last year. The final was held at Ryogoku Kokugikan. Hiromu Takahashi became the second wrestler to win two consecutive Best of the Super Jrs. tournaments after Tiger Mask IV, who previously won in 2004 and 2005 and the third person to become a three-time tournament winner after Jushin Thunder Liger and Koji Kanemoto.

2022
The twenty-ninth Best of the Super Juniors began on May 15 and finished on June 3 at Nippon Budokan. For the first time in 2 years, the tournament went back to its traditional calendar position of mid-May–early June, ran on its own separate from World Tag League, and returned to a two-block format, featuring wrestlers from NJPW Strong, Consejo Mundial de Lucha Libre (CMLL), Impact Wrestling, Gleat, and All Elite Wrestling (AEW). Hiromu Takahashi became the first-ever wrestler to win three consecutive Best of the Super Jrs. tournaments and also the first to become a four-time tournament winner.

References

External links
Best of the Super Juniors at NJPW.co.jp 

New Japan Pro-Wrestling tournaments